The Evansville Crush was an American indoor soccer team, founded in 2010. The team was a member of the Premier Arena Soccer League (PASL-Premier), the development league for the Professional Arena Soccer League  (PASL), and played in the Midwest Conference. They played their home matches at the Metro Sports Center in the city of Evansville, Indiana. Before the start of the 2010 season, the Crush hosted the Hoosier Cup tournament with six Midwest clubs. They would go undefeated in the knockout rounds and beat the Louisville Lightning in overtime of championship game. In 2013, the team was replaced by the Evansville Kings but lasted only one season.

Year-by-year

Regular season

Playoff record

See also
Sports in Evansville

References

External links
 Evansville Crush website

Premier Arena Soccer League teams
Soccer clubs in Indiana
Sports in Evansville, Indiana
Indoor soccer clubs in the United States
2010 establishments in Indiana
2013 disestablishments in Indiana
Association football clubs established in 2010
Association football clubs disestablished in 2013